Ivan Pernar (3 November 1889 – 2 April 1967) was a Croatian politician of the Croatian Peasant Party (CPP, Hrvatska Seljačka Stranka). He was a member of the National Assembly of the Kingdom of Serbs, Croats and Slovenes.

On 20 June 1928 Pernar was one of several Croatian Peasant Party representatives shot at by People's Radical Party representative Puniša Račić. While Pernar recovered from the gunshot, CPP leader Stjepan Radić died from the wounds suffered in the attack. During the subsequent January 6th Dictatorship Pernar was jailed in Sremska Mitrovica for 3 years.

Pernar was later selected as a senator for the Banovina of Croatia. In 1945, he emigrated to the United States of America where he remained until his death in 1967.

An eponymous politician Ivan Pernar in contemporary Croatia, is his grandnephew.

References

External links 
 Zlatko Begonja: Ivan Pernar on Croatian-Serbian Relations After the 1928 Assassination in Belgrade

1889 births
1967 deaths
People from Marija Gorica
People from the Kingdom of Croatia-Slavonia
Croatian Peasant Party politicians
Representatives in the Yugoslav National Assembly (1921–1941)
Yugoslav emigrants to the United States